Roulette (international title) or "Рулетка" (Russian title) – Russian Roulette (UK and Japanese title) is an emo/hard rock band from Kazan, Russia.

The band has released four top selling albums in their nine-year career, including The Red Album featuring the #1 single “Hear My Voice”. Their single, the power balled “Natasha”, reached #2 on the Top 5 in Russia.

History
In 1999 guitarist and singer Nikolay (Nikki) Minkov, bassist Alexy Belov, bassist, guitarist Jan Ianenkov, American guitarist Kyle Kyle and drummer Sascha Alexander came together to form Roulette.

The band released a self-titled debut album in 1999, featuring a stylized Hammer & Sickle on the cover. The band gained a reputation quickly of being stand-offish with the press and fans which only served to fuel the band's popularity. Their following releases have sold five million copies in Russia. The Red Album has been #1 on the charts since its release in September 2007.

In 2008 the band received the Scandinavian Music Award as the best international act.

Lineup

•	Nikolai (Nikki) Minkov – Vocals and Guitar
•	Alexy Belov - Bass
•	Jan Ianenkov – Guitar
•	Kyle Kyle – Guitar
•	Sascha Alexander – Drums

Discography
Roulette, Russian (1999)
1. Above & Beyond
2. Concrete Cover-Up
3. Black Box
4. Surrender
5. So Long Comrade
6. Sinister Soldier
7. X
8. Silence Remains
9. Locked Door

Blood Red (2001)
1. River Of Red
2. Immortal Secret
3. Darkened Words
4. Rouge
5. Shrapnel
6. A Sickle Through My Heart
7. Hammering It Home
8. White Red & Blue
9. Silence Calling
10. Hell’s Cradle
11. City Skyline

Live in Red Square (2003)
1. Last Words
2. Stained Memories
3. S.O.S. to Russia
4. Paint The Town Red
5. Bullet For My Love
6. Three Little Words To Hear Me Speak
7. In Shade
8. Lotus Blossom

The Silent Majority (2005)
1. Burning Brothers
2. Hungry Hearts, Empty Souls
3. Sour Candy
4. Flames For My Father
5. Five Finger Discount
6. AK
7. Communist Cravings
8. Goodbye Gorbachev
9. Simple Solution
10. Count Down To Corruption
11. The Hellmouth
12. Vicious Cycle

The Red Album (2007)
1. Silent Solitude
2. Release The Beast, Release My Voice
3. Regret
4. Hear My Voice
5. The Coldest Shoulder
6. 47 Is My Favourite Number
7. Frozen Lips
8. Steal Eyes
9. The Darkest Day
10. Saving Grace
11. Phoenix Rising

External links

 Roulette "Hear My Voice" Official Video
 Roulette's Official Site

Russian rock music groups